Thomas Cromwell (c. 1485–1540) was an English statesman, 1st Earl of Essex, and chief minister of King Henry VIII.

Thomas Cromwell may also refer to:

 Thomas Cromwell (Parliamentary diarist) (c. 1540–c. 1611), grandson of the chief minister, English Member of Parliament
 Thomas Cromwell, 1st Earl of Ardglass (1594–1653), Commander of the Regiment of Horse (Ireland) for King Charles I of England
 Thomas Cromwell, 3rd Earl of Ardglass (1653–1682), English peer
 Thomas Cromwell (antiquary) (1792–1870), English dissenting minister and antiquary
 Thomas Cromwell (jurist) (born 1952), Canadian jurist and Puisne Justice on the Supreme Court of Canada
 Thomas Lord Cromwell, Elizabethan play

See also
 Thomas Y. Crowell (1836–1915), American bookbinder and publisher